The  Arizona Rattlers season was the twenty-fourth season for the arena football franchise in the Arena Football League. The team was coached by Kevin Guy and played their home games at Talking Stick Resort Arena. They moved to the Indoor Football League after the season.

Standings

Schedule

Regular season
The 2016 regular season schedule was released on December 10, 2015.

Playoffs

Roster

References

Arizona Rattlers
Arizona Rattlers seasons
Arizona Rattlers
2010s in Phoenix, Arizona